Jamides allectus is a butterfly in the family Lycaenidae. It was described by Henley Grose-Smith in 1894. It is endemic to New Guinea (West Irian and New Ireland).

Subspecies
J. a. allectus (Irian Jaya)
J. a. jobiensis Tite, 1960 (Jobi)
J. a. sarmice (Fruhstorfer, 1916) (New Ireland)

References

External links

Jamides Hübner, [1819] at Markku Savela's Lepidoptera and Some Other Life Forms. Retrieved June 3, 2017.

Jamides
Butterflies described in 1894
Endemic fauna of New Guinea